Arnos Vale Cemetery (also written Arno's Vale Cemetery), in Arnos Vale, Bristol, England, was established in 1837. Its first burial was in 1839. The cemetery followed a joint-stock model, funded by shareholders. It was laid out as an Arcadian landscape with buildings by Charles Underwood. Most of its area is listed, Grade II*, on the Register of Historic Parks and Gardens of special historic interest in England.

The cemetery has a number of listed buildings and monuments, including the Grade II* listed Church of England mortuary chapel, Nonconformist mortuary chapel, entrance lodges and gates and the screen walls to main entrance.

History

The cemetery was designed by Charles Underwood in the style of a Greek Necropolis. Within a few years of its opening in 1837 it became the most fashionable place to be buried in Bristol.

During the 20th century the cemetery fell into disrepair, and local groups began campaigning for its restoration. In 1987 the owner disclosed plans to exhume the bodies and develop the site for housing. Early in the 21st century, following a public campaign, the site was subject to a compulsory purchase order by Bristol City Council.

In 2003 it was featured on the BBC programme Restoration. The cemetery was a South West region runner-up and has since received a £4.8 million Heritage Lottery Fund grant. The cemetery is undergoing restoration, however the Mortuary Chapel, Entrance Lodges and Gates and Nonconformist Mortuary Chapel remain on the English Heritage Heritage at Risk Register.

Notable people buried at Arnos Vale 
Charles Baggs, Roman Catholic bishop
Harry Bamford, professional footballer
Daniel Burges (VC, DSO, Croix de Guerre avec Palme (France); Greek Military Cross (2nd Class)), World War I hero
Roland Brotherhood, engineer and friend of Isambard Kingdom Brunel
Mary Carpenter, educational and social reformer
Gronow Davis (VC), Crimean War hero
Elsie Joy Davison, Air Transport Auxiliary pilot, the first female British aviator to die in World War II
William Day Wills, industrialist and tobacco manufacturer
Henry Overton Wills II, industrialist  and tobacco manufacturer
 Dora Greenwell (1821–1882), poet
Anthony Norris Groves, missionary
George Müller, orphanage founder
George Rawson, hymnwriter
Elisha Smith Robinson, industrialist, Mayor of Bristol 1866 and benefactor
Raja Ram Mohan Roy, Indian social reformer
Sir Charles Wathen, clothier, Mayor of Bristol
Sir Frank William Wills, architect, surveyor and Mayor of Bristol
Harry Blanshard Wood (VC, MM), World War I hero

Chhatri of Raja Ram Mohan Roy 
The reformer Raja Ram Mohan Roy (22 May 1772 – 27 September 1833) died at Bristol on 27 September 1833 and was first buried at Stapleton, but was reinterred in 1843 in the newly laid out Arnos Vale cemetery under the mausoleum designed by William Prinsep, which is a copy of an Indian tomb or chhatri (literally meaning umbrella). According to information available at the cemetery, a commemoration is held annually at this chhatri, attended by Unitarians, Bristol's Lord Mayor and the Indian High Commissioner plus Indians and British who remember with gratitude the works of the "Founder of Modern India".

A previously missing (and unknown) miniature ivory portrait bust of Raja Ram Mohan Roy was unveiled at the annual commemoration of the death of the Indian religious, social, and educational reformer, and humanitarian, at Arnos Vale cemetery in Bristol, on 22 September 2013. Ram Mohan Roy challenged traditional Hindu culture and indicated the lines of progress for Indian society under British rule. The ivory portrait bust of Ram Mohan Roy made in London in 1832 by the famous ivory carver Benjamin Cheverton (1796-1876), is based on a bust made around the same time by the gifted sculptor George Clarke (1796-1842). The bust is exceptional because Ram Mohan Roy gave sittings to Clarke (the only time he did this for a sculptor) to enable the bust to be modelled, and Cheverton copied the bust in ivory for George Clarke, who lent his model to Cheverton to enable this to be done. The process employed by Cheverton to make the copy means that it is identical with Clarke's bust, save that it is on a reduced scale. Clarke's bust is missing, and this small ivory bust is the finest three-dimensional representation of Ram Mohan Roy that exists, since it reflects exactly what was observed when the great man sat to Clarke to have his bust modelled.

War Graves 
More than 500 British Commonwealth servicemen and women from both World Wars commemorated by the Commonwealth War Graves Commission (CWGC) are buried or listed at the cemetery, mostly from military hospitals of the area. Most of the 356 servicemen from World War I are buried in the 'Soldiers Corner' plot near the main entrance. Special memorials commemorate one casualty whose grave could not be located and another buried at Bedminster Church Cemetery whose grave could not be maintained. There are 149 servicemen and women from World War II buried here, all in scattered graves apart from a group in a plot in the upper part of the cemetery who were from the Naval Hospital in Barrow Gurney. Those whose graves are not marked by headstones are listed on four bronze panels on a Screen Wall memorial. Nearly  70,000 casualties from the Western Front were brought to Bristol on trains and in hospital ships, "and the relatively small number of servicemen buried in Bristol indicates that, once a wounded serviceman reached England, his chances of survival were quite good".

The memorial, designed by W H Watkins, commissioned by the British Red Cross Society and paid for by public subscription, was unveiled by Emily, Duchess of Beaufort and dedicated by the Bishop of Bristol, the Right Rev George Nickson on 21 October 1921. It consists of a central gallery of five arches (with the four bronze panels on the wall directly behind the two pairs of arches either side of the central arch) and two flanking walls. On which are carved the inscriptions:

Archives
Burial registers are held by the Arnos Vale Cemetery Trust. Records of the Friends of Arnos Vale Cemetery are held at Bristol Archives (Ref. 45068) (online catalogue).

Grade II listed monuments

Notes

References

External links 

 Arnos Vale Cemetery Trust
 
 
 
 flickr: Arnos Vale group
 Friends of Arnos Vale Cemetery
 

Cemeteries in Bristol
1837 establishments in England
Parks and open spaces in Bristol
Structures on the Heritage at Risk register
Commonwealth War Graves Commission cemeteries in England
Grade II* listed parks and gardens in Bristol